is a Japanese modern pentathlete. He competed at the 2012 Summer Olympics.

References

External links
 

1980 births
Living people
Japanese male modern pentathletes
Olympic modern pentathletes of Japan
Modern pentathletes at the 2012 Summer Olympics
Sportspeople from Nagoya
Asian Games medalists in modern pentathlon
Modern pentathletes at the 2010 Asian Games
Asian Games bronze medalists for Japan
Medalists at the 2010 Asian Games
20th-century Japanese people
21st-century Japanese people